The 1918 Kendall Orange and Black football team represented Henry Kendall College (later renamed the University of Tulsa) during the 1918 college football season. In their first and only year under head coach Arthur Smith, the Orange and Black compiled a 1–2 record and were outscored by their opponents by a total of 56 to 9.

Schedule

References

Kendall
Tulsa Golden Hurricane football seasons
Kendall Orange and Black football